Peter McMartin (born May 11, 1805) was the second Mayor of Jersey City, New Jersey.

Biography
When Jersey City was incorporated as a municipality on February 22, 1838, McMartin was a member of the first Common Council. He succeeded Dudley S. Gregory as mayor two years later. He served a single one-year term from April 1840 to April 1841. He was succeeded by Gregory. He served as Jersey City freeholder in 1847 and 1848.

On November 16, 1830, Martin married Harriet Lyon at St. Matthew's Episcopal Church in Jersey City.

References
 as

Year of death missing
Mayors of Jersey City, New Jersey
1805 births